Adrien Douady (25 September 1935 – 2 November 2006) was a French mathematician.

Douady was a student of Henri Cartan at the École normale supérieure, and initially worked in homological algebra. His thesis concerned deformations of complex analytic spaces. Subsequently, he became more interested in the work of Pierre Fatou and Gaston Julia and made significant contributions to the fields of analytic geometry and dynamical systems. Together with his former student John H. Hubbard, he launched a new subject, and a new school, studying properties of iterated quadratic complex mappings.  They made important mathematical contributions in this field of complex dynamics, including a study of the Mandelbrot set. One of their most fundamental results is that the Mandelbrot set is connected; perhaps most important is their theory of renormalization of (polynomial-like) maps. The Douady rabbit, a quadratic filled Julia set, is named after him.

Douady taught at the University of Nice and was a professor at the Paris-Sud 11 University, Orsay. He was a member of Bourbaki and an invited speaker at the International Congress of Mathematicians in 1966 at Moscow and again in 1986 in Berkeley.

He was elected to the Académie des Sciences in 1997, and was featured in the French animation project Dimensions.

He died after diving into the cold Mediterranean from a favourite spot near his vacation home in the Var.

His son, Raphael Douady, is also a noted mathematician and an economist.

See also
Beltrami equation
Jessen's icosahedron
Kuiper's theorem

References

External links
http://picard.ups-tlse.fr/~cheritat/Adrien70/index.php

http://www.math.jacobs-university.de/adrien with a guest book to share your memories
Pictures with Adrien Douady

1935 births
2006 deaths
20th-century French mathematicians
Dynamical systems theorists
Academic staff of Côte d'Azur University
Academic staff of Paris-Sud University
École Normale Supérieure alumni
Members of the French Academy of Sciences
Nicolas Bourbaki
People from La Tronche